Elections to Stockport Metropolitan Borough Council were held on 5 May 2011, with one third of the seats up for election.

The state of the parties after the election was:

Following the elections, the Liberal Democrats lost their majority on the council for the first time since 2002. They were however able to continue in power in a minority administration.

Results

Bramhall North

Bramhall South

Bredbury and Woodley

Bredbury Green and Romiley

Brinnington and Central

Cheadle and Gatley

Cheadle Hulme North

Cheadle Hulme South

Davenport and Cale Green

Edgeley and Cheadle Heath

Hazel Grove

Heald Green

Heatons North

Heatons South

Manor
''Patrick McAuley left Labour and became a Lib Dem councillor in 2012.

Marple North

Marple South

Offerton

Reddish North

Reddish South

Stepping Hill

References

External links
Stockport local election results 2011

2011 English local elections
2011
2010s in Greater Manchester